is an opera seria in three acts with music by Antonio Sacchini set to a libretto by  (a.k.a. Giacomo Duranti), based on the epic poem Gerusalemme liberata by Torquato Tasso. The opera was first performed during the 1772 Carnival season at the Teatro Regio Ducale in Milan.

In Armida, Sacchini incorporated many elements of French opera, including frequent use of chorus, ballet, and theatrical spectacle on a grand scale. Sacchini later wrote two more operas loosely based on the same story from Tasso: the 1780 London work Rinaldo, and his first French opera, Renaud, which was dedicated to Marie Antoinette.

Roles

References

 

Opera seria
Operas by Antonio Sacchini
Italian-language operas
Operas based on works by Torquato Tasso
Operas
1772 operas